Ablinga is a village in Lithuania, located  east of Klaipėda. First mentioned in the 14th century, it had 87 residents in 1923, 97 in 1950, 57 in 1970 and 20 in 1979. The 2011 census recorded village's population of 7 residents.

On June 23, 1941, the second day of the Nazi invasion of Soviet Union, Nazi punitive squadron executed 42 villagers from Ablinga and nearby Žvaginiai (28 men and 14 women) and burned down the houses. The motives for the mass killing are not entirely clear to this day. In 1972, in memory of the massacre a sculpture park was established on the Žvaginiai hill fort. The memorial, as the first monumental display of folk sculptures, was an important development in revival and modernization of the traditional Lithuanian art of wood carving and inspired other similar sculpture parks.

References

Villages in Klaipėda County
Klaipėda District Municipality

Nazi war crimes in Lithuania